Macbeth is a 1960 television film adaptation of the William Shakespeare play presented as the November 20, 1960 episode of the American anthology series Hallmark Hall of Fame. The series' second production of the play was, like the 1954 live telecast, also directed by George Schaefer, and again starred English-born American actor Maurice Evans and Australian actress Judith Anderson. The supporting cast, however, was different, consisting entirely of British actors, and was filmed on location in Scotland; the 1954 version had used a mostly American cast.

Production
Filmed in color, the program was described in a contemporary publication as the "[m]ost expensive TV show of all time, costing $1,200,000."

Internationally, this version was treated as a feature film, and was released theatrically in Europe. It was entered into the 11th Berlin International Film Festival.

This television film won five Primetime Emmy Awards at the 13th annual award ceremony, held in 1961.

Principal cast 
 Maurice Evans – Macbeth
 Judith Anderson – Lady Macbeth
 Michael Hordern – Banquo
 Ian Bannen – Macduff
 Malcolm Keen - King Duncan

Primetime Emmy Awards 
At the 13th Primetime Emmy Awards ceremony, the top show of the night was the NBC anthology Hallmark Hall of Fame for this production of Macbeth. It won in all of its nominated categories, tying the record (since broken) of five major awards.

 Outstanding Program Achievement in the Field of Drama
 The Program of the Year
 Outstanding Single Performance by an Actor in a Leading Role (Maurice Evans)
 Outstanding Single Performance by an Actress in a Leading Role (Judith Anderson)
 Outstanding Directorial Achievement in Drama (George Schaefer)

See also 
 13th Primetime Emmy Awards

References

External links 
 

1960 drama films
1960 films
1960 television plays
Emmy Award-winning programs
Films based on Macbeth
Films directed by George Schaefer
Hallmark Hall of Fame episodes